Martiniere may refer to:

Schools
La Martiniere is the name use for the following schools founded by the French adventurer and soldier Claude Martin:

 La Martiniere Calcutta in Calcutta, India
 La Martiniere Lucknow in Lucknow, India
 La Martiniere Lyon in Lyons, France

See also
 La Martiniere College

Surname
 Gérard de la Martinière, French businessman
 Stephan Martinière, artist, cartoonist and animation director